John Gerard Flynn (born 21 May 1953) is a former Australian politician. He was a Member of the Queensland Legislative Assembly.

Early life

John Flynn was born in Brisbane, the son of John Joseph Flynn, a postman, and Kathleen Josephine, née De Hayr. He attended convent school at Rosalie and then Marist Brothers College Rosalie, before studying at the University of Queensland from 1971 to 1982, receiving a Bachelor of Science (Hons, 1975) and a Bachelor of Medicine, Bachelor of Surgery (Hons). He married Kelyn Ann Blanch, a teacher, on 5 January 1975. From 1976 to 1977 he was a biochemistry tutor at the university, and from 1978 to 1982 a part-time analytical biochemist at Royal Brisbane Hospital. In 1983 he was appointed medical officer at the Royal Brisbane and Royal Children's Hospitals, before becoming a private general practitioner in Toowoomba in 1985.

Politics
A member of the Labor Party and president of the Toowoomba North branch, he was elected to the Queensland Legislative Assembly in 1989 as the member for Toowoomba North. He was defeated in 1992.

References

1953 births
Living people
Members of the Queensland Legislative Assembly
Australian Labor Party members of the Parliament of Queensland